Katie Lee (October 23, 1919 – November 1, 2017) was an American folk singer, actress, writer, photographer and environmental activist.

From the 1950s, Lee often sang about rivers and white water rafting. She was a vocal opponent of Glen Canyon Dam, which closed its gates in 1963, and called for the canyon to be returned to its natural state; for her environmental activism, was often called "the Desert Goddess of Glen Canyon."

Her obituary in The New York Times states, "Ms. Lee never forgave the builders of the Glen Canyon Dam and said the only thing that prevented her from blowing it up was that she did not know how."

Early life
Kathryn Louise Lee was born in Aledo, Illinois on October 23, 1919 to decorator Ruth (Detwiler) and architect and homebuilder Zanna Lee. When she was three months old, her family moved to Tucson, Arizona. She graduated from the University of Arizona with a Bachelor of Fine Arts in Drama. Following her graduation, she left for Hollywood where she studied with two of the most successful folksingers of the 1940s, Burl Ives and Josh White.

Folk singer and author
Lee's early folk music albums, Songs of Couch and Consultation (1957) and Life Is Just a Bed of Neuroses (1960), parody the rising popularity of psychoanalysis at the time. Both albums have long been out of print, but six of her later CDs remain available. She also released three videos, including Love Song to Glen Canyon (DVD, 2007).

In 1964, Lee released an album on Folkways Records, entitled Folk Songs of the Colorado River. In the 1980s, she recorded a cassette-only release, Colorado River Songs, consisting of old songs popular among river runners on the Colorado River and the Grand Canyon, and some original compositions. This release was hailed by Edward Abbey and David Foreman, among others. Colorado River Songs was expanded to include more songs and re-released in 1997 on CD. She released Glen Canyon River Journeys on CD, which mixes music and her narration. She also was featured on the 2005 Smithsonian Folkways compilation album, Songs and Stories from Grand Canyon. In October 2011, Katie Lee was inducted into the Arizona Music Hall of Fame.

She authored five books. Ten Thousand Goddam Cattle: A History of the American Cowboy in Song, Story and Verse (1976) is a study of the music, stories, and poetry of the American cowboy, later recorded as an album with Travis Edmonson. Sandstone Seduction, a 2004 memoir, relates Lee's continuing love affair with desert rivers and canyons, and discusses her Lady Godiva-style bicycle ride through downtown Jerome, Arizona, where she lived.

Lee donated her extraordinary collection of photographs, writings, songs and music, letters, and journals to the Cline Library Special Collections and Archives at Northern Arizona University.

Lee published music and books under the label Katydid Books and Music.

Environmental activism

Lee was known for her activism against the damming of rivers, and particularly her opposition to Glen Canyon Dam in Northern Arizona, which opened in 1963. After joining a rafting trip in the Grand Canyon in 1953, she became a regular on river trips on the Colorado River and joined the opposition to the construction of Glen Canyon Dam.

In September and October 1955, Tad Nichols, Frank Wright, and she traveled through and documented parts of the canyon that later were to be submerged. This threesome named at least 25 of the side canyons they explored in Glen Canyon. Lee's campaign to protect the canyon included a one-woman protest exhibition of photographs where she posed naked among the canyon's landscape. Her protest was featured in books and folk songs she authored. "When they drowned that place, they drowned my whole guts", Lee said in a 2010 interview. "And I will never forgive the bastards. May they rot in hell." For her environmental activism, Lee was often described as "the Goddess of Glen Canyon."

Lee was a member of the Advisory Board of the Glen Canyon Institute which is a non-profit organization dedicated to the restoration of Glen Canyon and a free flowing Colorado River.

Personal life
Records indicate that Lee seems to have been married three times. She was first married to Charles Eld, who was mentioned in her book Sandstone Seduction. She wrote that she "...went to work for the war effort at Davis Monthan Field, married a shavetail in '42, got pregnant, had a son, [and] got divorced in '45." This son is identified as Ronald Eld in the New York Times obituary from November 10, 2017.  Charles was awarded full custody of Ronald in 1950.  A son is mentioned (not by name) briefly with some regret, as 10 years old in her journal from the 1954 trip. There are pictures of Katie and a young "Ronnie" in the NAU Cline Library Colorado Plateau digital archives.

The N.Y. Times obituary mentions a second husband named Eugene Busch (sic), Jr.   An article in the Arizona Daily Star on June 16, 2015 includes a reprint of an article from 1959 where Mrs. Gene Bush (Katie) is interviewed in Holmdel NJ.  Katie married Bush in 1958.  The marriage lasted 3 years and then Katie moved to Aspen, Colorado from New Jersey in 1961.

She met her "last and best husband", Edwin Carl "Brandy" Brandelius, Jr. — to whom her book Sandstone Seduction is dedicated — on a trip to Baja California. in 1968. Brandy had an emphysema and was staying at this location in Mexico when the two met.  When they married Katie Lee became the step-mother to "Brandy's" children Jerilyn Lee Brandelius, Ken, Susie and John Brandelius.

Brandy was a war veteran, a race car driver, announcer, and good friend of Turk Murphy. Lee noted Brandy as the prime influence on finishing and publishing her first book, Ten Thousand Goddam Cattle. Brandy died in 1973 while they were married.

Lee lived in Jerome, Arizona from 1971 until her death in 2017; she died in her sleep at her home there on November 1, 2017, aged 98. Lee's partner, Joey van Leeuwen, whom she met in 1979 in Australia while on a round-the-world trip, committed suicide the day after her death.

Katie and Joey were cremated and their ashes were scattered on the San Juan River.

Popular culture
Chronicles of Lee's adventures in Baja California appear in the book Almost An Island by Bruce Berger. In 2016, a short documentary entitled Kickass Katie Lee was screened at Telluride Mountainfilm, a documentary film festival where Lee was a regular guest. Lee featured prominently in "Cry Me A River", a radio episode by The Kitchen Sisters, which explored the damming of American rivers.

Lee's song, "Gunslinger", from Songs of Couch and Consultation, was translated to Swedish in 1965 and was recorded by Per Myrberg as "Skjutgalen". It also was recorded by the Limeliters on their 1961 album, The Slightly Fabulous Limeliters. This may still be available on a BMG Collectibles CD. Utah Phillips praised Katie Lee and Songs of Couch and Consultation on the 1996 album, The Past Didn't Go Anywhere on the track, "Half a Ghost Town".

Discography

Studio albums
 Spicy Songs for Cool Knights (1956)
 Songs Of Couch And Consultation (1957)
 Life Is Just A Bed Of Neuroses (1960)
 Folk Songs of the Colorado River (1964)
 Love's Little Sisters (1975)
 Colorado River Songs (1976)
 Ten Thousand Goddam Cattle (1977)
 Fenced! (1978)
 His Knibbs and the Badger (1992, with Ed Stabler)
 Glen Canyon River Journeys (1998)
 Folksongs from the Fifties (2009)

Live albums
 The Best of Katie Lee: Live at the Troubadour (1962)

Bibliography

Lee published five books:
 Ten Thousand Goddam Cattle: A History of the American Cowboy in Song, Story & Verse (1976)
 All My Rivers are Gone: A Journey of Discovery through Glen Canyon (1998)
 Sandstone Seduction: Rivers and Lovers, Canyons and Friends (2004)
 Ballad Of Gutless Ditch (2010)
 The Ghosts of Dandy Crossing (2014)

References

Notes

References

External links

 KatyDoodIt.com Katie Lee's official website
 NPR interview, audio
 tribute, Northern Arizona University, Katie Lee: Goddess of Glen Canyon, 1919–2017
 Katie Lee page Glen Canyon Institute

1919 births
2017 deaths
American women singers
Early Grand Canyon river runners
Musicians from Tucson, Arizona
Folk music of the American Southwest
People from Jerome, Arizona
Singers from Arizona
University of Arizona alumni
Writers from Tucson, Arizona
21st-century American women